Weingart is a German surname. Notable people with the surname include:

 Ben Weingart (born 1888), US real estate developer and philanthropist
 Steve Weingart (born 1966), US musician
 Peter Weingart  (born 1941), German sociology professor
 Wolfgang Weingart (1941–2021), German graphic designer

See also
 Weingart Stadium
 Weingarten (disambiguation)
 Wingard (disambiguation)

German-language surnames
Jewish surnames